Hugo Eduardo de León Rodríguez (born 27 February 1958) is a Uruguayan football coach and former player, who played as a defender.

Club career
De León joined Nacional in 1977. With Nacional, he won two Uruguayan league titles, in 1977 and 1980, the Copa Libertadores in 1980. In 1981, he left Nacional to play for Gremio therefore missing the final game of the 1980 Intercontinental Cup which Nacional would subsequently win. With Gremio he won the Copa Libertadores and the Intercontinental Cup in 1983. After spells in Brazil and Spain he returned to Nacional in 1988, to win the Copa Libertadores and Intercontinental Cup in that year, and the Copa Interamericana and Recopa Sudamericana in 1989. At the end of the year, he left Nacional to play for River Plate of Argentina, where he won the 1989/1990 league title. He returned to Nacional in 1992 and won his third Uruguayan league title as a player. He retired in 1993.

International career
The 189 cm defender was capped 48 times for Uruguay between July 1979 and June 1990, including four games at the 1990 World Cup. De León helped the Uruguay national team win the 1980 Mundialito, a tournament celebrating the 50th anniversary of the first World Cup. De Leon also led Uruguay to a 2nd place finish at the 1989 Copa America hosted in Brazil.

Coaching career
As a coach, De León was in charge of several clubs in Uruguay, Brazil and México, including Nacional, Gremio and Monterrey. As coach of Nacional, they won the Uruguayan league titles of 1998, 2000 and 2001.

Because of a conflict with the Uruguayan coachs association, who does not validate the coach course he took in Brazil, De León has not worked in Uruguay since 2004.

External links
 Club Nacional de Football 
 

1958 births
Living people
People from Rivera Department
Uruguayan footballers
Expatriate footballers in Argentina
Expatriate footballers in Brazil
Uruguayan expatriate footballers
Uruguayan people of Spanish descent
Association football defenders
Uruguayan Primera División players
Campeonato Brasileiro Série A players
Argentine Primera División players
La Liga players
Uruguay under-20 international footballers
Uruguay international footballers
1979 Copa América players
1989 Copa América players
1990 FIFA World Cup players
Uruguayan football managers
Campeonato Brasileiro Série A managers
Expatriate football managers in Argentina
Expatriate football managers in Brazil
Expatriate football managers in Mexico
Club Nacional de Football players
Grêmio Foot-Ball Porto Alegrense players
Sport Club Corinthians Paulista players
Club Atlético River Plate footballers
Santos FC players
CD Logroñés footballers
Botafogo de Futebol e Regatas players
Ituano FC managers
Fluminense FC managers
C.F. Monterrey managers
Club Nacional de Football managers
Grêmio Foot-Ball Porto Alegrense managers
Uruguayan vice-presidential candidates